Loughgall Football Club is a semi-professional, Northern Irish football club playing in the NIFL Championship.

History
The club, founded in 1967, is situated in the village of Loughgall, near Armagh in County Armagh and they play their home games in the village at Lakeview Park. They achieved senior status in 2004 on promotion to the Irish Premier League, but reverted to intermediate status upon relegation in 2007. Keith Kearney is their youngest ever goalscorer, when he scored in the Irish cup 4th round tie against Tandragee Rovers FC. He was a 68th minute substitute making his debut and scored in the 77th minute aged just 14 years and 187 days old. On 3 March 2018, Loughgall beat Glenavon 2-1 to reach the semi final of the Irish Cup for the first time since 1997.

Current squad

Managerial history
 Noel Willis (1967–70)
 George Willis (1970–76)
 Sam Robinson (1977–81)
 Raymond Nesbitt (1983–84)
 Willie Forbes (1984–85)
 Alfie Wylie (1986–89)
 Alan Fraser (1999)
 Ronnie Cromie (1999-01)
 Jimmy Gardiner (2001–06)
 Shane Reddish (2006–07)
 Niall Currie (2007–Feb 2011)
 Colin Malone (May 2011–Aug 2013) 
 Gary McKinstry (Aug 2013–Dec 2013)
 Brian Adair (Dec 2013–Dec 2014)
 Noel Mitchell (Jan 2015–May 2015)
 Stephen Uprichard and Steven Hawe (May 2015–November 2016)
 Dean Smith (November 2016-)

Honours

Senior honours
Mid-Ulster Cup: 3
2003–04, 2007–08, 2019-20

Intermediate honours
Irish League B Division/First Division /IFA Intermediate League/IFA Championship: 7
1994–95, 1995–96, 1996–97, 1997–98, 2003–04, 2007–08, 2009–10
Irish Intermediate Cup: 2
1997–98, 2007–08
IFA Intermediate League Cup: 1
2007–08
Bob Radcliffe Cup: 12
1978–79, 1996–97, 1998–99, 1999–00, 2001–02, 2002–03, 2003–04, 2007–08, 2008–09, 2009–10, 2012–13, 2014–15

External links
 Loughgall FC Website

Association football clubs established in 1967
Association football clubs in Northern Ireland
NIFL Championship clubs
Association football clubs in County Armagh
1967 establishments in Northern Ireland